Nina Parker is an American television journalist, television presenter and fashion designer. Parker co-hosts Nightly Pop on E!, a late-night entertainment news show that debuted in 2018.

Life and career 
Parker was raised in Sacramento, California. She received her bachelor's degree in broadcast and electronic communication arts from San Francisco State University. While at San Francisco State University, she became a member of Delta Sigma Theta Sorority, Incorporated.

She began her entertainment career at TMZ in 2007. In 2011, she went on to work as an entertainment correspondent for The Insider. In 2015, she became the host for the Love & Hip Hop reunion shows, and hosted for four years until 2020. She was hired as an inaugural co-host on E!'s Nightly Pop in 2018. Parker has appeared as a panelist on Dating #NoFilter.

On May 14, 2021, she released a self-titled clothing line for Macy's, the first plus-size brand by a Black designer released exclusively by the retailer. She was inspired to develop a line in 2019 due to her own frustration with the lack of fashionable options for plus-size women. Parker previously designed her own gowns for Live from the Red Carpet event pre-shows such as the 2020 Academy Awards. In collaboration with Reunited Clothing, Parker designed every item in the Nina Parker Collection. New items debuted monthly in 2021 after the initial release.

References

External links 
Official Instagram
 

Living people
21st-century African-American women
American women fashion designers
American fashion designers
American television journalists
Entertainment journalists
American television reporters and correspondents
American women television journalists
African-American journalists
People from Sacramento, California
Year of birth missing (living people)